FalconSAT-2 (FS 2, COSPAR 2006-F01) was a satellite built by students of the United States Air Force Academy as part of the FalconSAT program. It was intended to have been placed into low Earth orbit to study the effects of plasma on communications with spacecraft, however it failed to reach orbit due to a malfunction of its carrier rocket.

The FalconSAT-2 program started in late 2000, as a follow-up to FalconSAT-1. The spacecraft was based on a bus constructed by Surrey Satellite Technology Ltd, with the experiments being constructed at the USAF Academy. The primary instrument aboard FalconSAT-2 was the Miniaturized Electrostatic Analyzer, or MESA. Following the Columbia accident this mission was delayed, and FalconSAT-2 was removed from the Shuttle manifest.

It was then assigned as the payload for the maiden flight of the Falcon 1 rocket, which was launched from Omelek Island at 22:30 GMT on 24 March 2006. At launch, a corroded nut caused an engine fire, leading to the failure of the engine 25 seconds into the flight. The rocket fell into the Pacific Ocean close to the launch site. FalconSAT-2 was thrown clear off the rocket, and landed in a storage shed on Omelek Island, just a few feet from its own shipping container.

See also

C/NOFS

References

Spacecraft launched in 2006
Satellite launch failures
SpaceX military payloads
Rocket launches in 2006
Space accidents and incidents in the United States